Daniel 'Dani' Estrada Agirrezabalaga (born 3 January 1987) is a Spanish footballer who plays mainly as a right midfielder.

He spent the better part of his professional career with Real Sociedad, appearing in 153 competitive matches and spending six seasons in La Liga with the club.

Club career
A product of Basque Country giants Real Sociedad's youth system, Estrada was born in Zarautz, Gipuzkoa, and he spent his first two senior seasons with the reserves in the Segunda División B. In 2006–07 he finished second in Group II in goalscoring, netting a career-best 13 goals.

Estrada made his debut with the first team on 10 February 2007, playing five minutes in a 1–2 home loss against Real Madrid. Three months later, in his third La Liga appearance, he was also brought from the bench against FC Barcelona (0–2 defeat, also at home), and finished his first year with eight games in an eventual relegation.

In the following two Segunda División campaigns, Estrada was irregularly put to use at Real Sociedad, as they consecutively failed to regain their top-flight status. In 2009–10, as the club returned to the latter competition after a three-year absence, he contributed 18 matches and 1,538 minutes.

After being reconverted by manager Martín Lasarte the previous year, Estrada was used exclusively as a full back in 2010–11. He scored his first goal for the first team on 26 February 2011, but also put one in his own net in a 4–1 loss at RCD Espanyol.

In late May 2014, Estrada renewed his contract with Real Sociedad until 2015. On 6 July of the following year, he signed a one-year deal with Deportivo Alavés after his link expired.

Honours
Real Sociedad
Segunda División: 2009–10

Alavés
Segunda División: 2015–16

References

External links

1987 births
Living people
People from Zarautz
Spanish footballers
Footballers from the Basque Country (autonomous community)
Association football defenders
Association football midfielders
Association football utility players
La Liga players
Segunda División players
Segunda División B players
Real Sociedad B footballers
Real Sociedad footballers
Deportivo Alavés players
Real Unión footballers
Barakaldo CF footballers